Henry Walpole Lack (31 October 1927 – 20 July 2009) was an Australian rules footballer who played with Melbourne in the Victorian Football League (VFL).

Family
The son of Raymond Tilston Lack (1892-1973), and Alice Matilda Rose Lack (1884-1974), née Walpole, Henry Walpole Lack was born at Myrtleford, Victoria, on 31 October 1927.

Footnotes

References
 
 Two Recruits in Demons' Team, The Age, (Friday, 2 May 1952), p.13.
 Monks, John, "He Didn't Lack It", The Sporting Globe, (Wednesday, 7 May 1952), p.1.
 Fresh Blood for Demons (Photograph), The Herald, (Friday, 27 March 1953), p.20.

External links 
 
 
 Harry Lack, at Demonwiki.

1927 births
2009 deaths
Australian rules footballers from Victoria (Australia)
Melbourne Football Club players
Myrtleford Football Club players